Omar Hassan Mohamud Istarliin  was a Somali Mayor of Mogadishu in the government of Aden Abdullah Osman Daar shortly before the military coup d'état of 1969. Following those events, he went into exile to form  the first anti-revolutionary front SODAF.

 He was also one of the signers of the Somali Manifesto.

References

Mayors of Mogadishu